The Mitsubishi Ki-1, also known as Mitsubishi Army Type 93 Heavy Bomber, was a bomber built by Mitsubishi for the Imperial Japanese Army in the 1930s. The Ki-1 design was heavily based on the Junkers K 37 and a mockup was ready in August 1932, with the first prototype being finished in March 1933. 

Despite its antiquated appearance, the Ki-1 was used in Manchukuo and in north China during the early stages of the Second Sino-Japanese War, in areas where danger from enemy fighter aircraft was minimal.

Design and development
The pilot and co-pilot were seated in tandem under an enclosed canopy, while gunners sat in semi-enclosed nose and dorsal gun turrets, each armed with a single  machine gun.

The Ki-1 shared a similar configuration with the Junkers S 36 first flown in 1927, militarized into the Junkers K37 by Junker's Swedish subsidiary AB Flygindustri at Limhamn near Malmö. It was able to reach altitudes not reachable for the fighters of 1927. However, as soon as 1930 this advantage was lost due to British developments such as the Bristol Bulldog fighter, and Junkers was not successful in selling the design. In 1931 however representatives of Mitsubishi from Japan visited the Limhamn facilities to study some of the military conversions of Junkers aircraft. The sole K 37 prototype S-AABP (ex D-1252 - S 36-prototype), as well as all development papers were purchased in part by funds raised by donations in Japan. The aircraft got the name Aikoku No.1 (patriotic gift).

The K37 prototype was brought to Japan and tested in combat during the Manchurian Incident of 1931, following which the Imperial Japanese Army Air Force authorized Mitsubishi to produce both heavy and light bomber variations. The heavy bomber Ki-1, was much larger than the original Junkers K37 and first flew in August 1932. A total of 118 aircraft were built in two versions between March 1933 and April 1936.

Operational history
The Mitsubishi Ki-1 was also designated Mitsubishi Army Type 93-I Heavy Bomber under the long aircraft nomenclature system used by the Japanese military. Already obsolete by the time of its introduction, it found use during the counterinsurgency operations of the Pacification of Manchukuo, as well as limited use during the Second Sino-Japanese War.

However, even with the new engines, the Ki-1 was still underpowered, and was unable to maintain altitude during single engine flights, which proved to be a serious issue during the aircraft's operational service due to lack of reliability of the engines. It was replaced in 1937 by the Fiat BR.20.

Variants
Ki-1-I (Army Type 93-I Heavy Bomber)Initial production variant, powered by two  Mitsubishi Ha2-II (Army Type 93-II 700 hp Water Cooled In-line) V-12 engines.
Ki-1-II (Army Type 93-II Heavy Bomber)Improved version with more powerful engines, strengthened airframe, powered by two  Mitsubishi Ha2-III (Army Type 93-III 700 hp Water Cooled In-line) V-12 engines.

Operators

Military operators

 Imperial Japanese Army Air Force

Specifications (Ki-1-I)

See also

Notes

Bibliography

External links

 "Japan Matches War Planes of Other Powers" Popular Mechanics, September 1937
 Junkers Aircraft of the 1920s

Ki-01, Mitsubishi
Ki-001
Low-wing aircraft
Aircraft first flown in 1932
Twin piston-engined tractor aircraft